Alagón may refer to:

Alagón (river), a river in Spain, tributary of the Tagus
Alagón, Zaragoza, a municipality in Spain